Live at the Lighthouse '66 is a live album by The Jazz Crusaders recorded in 1966 and released on the Pacific Jazz label.

Reception

AllMusic rated the album with 4½ stars calling it: "An excellent set of primarily straight-ahead (but soulful) jazz".

Track listing 
 "Aleluia" (Rey Guerra, Edu Lobo) - 6:00
 "Blues Up Tight" (Joe Sample) - 6:43 
 "You Don't Know What Love Is" (Gene de Paul, Don Raye) - 5:06
 "Miss It" (Wilton Felder) - 5:53
 "'Round Midnight" (Thelonious Monk, Bernie Hanighen, Cootie Williams) - 5:56 Bonus track on CD reissue
 "Some Other Blues" (John Coltrane) - 9:00 Bonus track on CD reissue
 "Scratch" (Wayne Henderson) - 8:02
 "Doin' That Thing" (Leroy Vinnegar) - 7:18
 "Milestones" (Miles Davis) - 6:43

Personnel 
The Jazz Crusaders
Wayne Henderson - trombone
Wilton Felder - tenor saxophone
Joe Sample - piano
Leroy Vinnegar - bass
Stix Hooper - drums

References 

The Jazz Crusaders live albums
1966 live albums
Pacific Jazz Records live albums
Albums recorded at the Lighthouse Café